Randall Hardy (born July 5, 1951) is an American politician who served in the Kansas Senate from the 24th district from 2017 until 2021. He initially defeated incumbent Tom Arpke in the 2016 Republican primary election, before himself losing a primary to J. R. Claeys in 2020.

Hardy lives in Salina, Kansas.

References

External links
Vote Smart Randall Hardy

1951 births
Living people
Republican Party Kansas state senators
21st-century American politicians
University of Kansas alumni
Oral Roberts University alumni
Politicians from Salina, Kansas